Olesya Nikiforova (born 15 April 1997) is a Russian sprint canoeist.

She participated at the 2018 ICF Canoe Sprint World Championships.

References

1997 births
Living people
Russian female canoeists
ICF Canoe Sprint World Championships medalists in Canadian